Ballymacegan (Baile Mhic Aogáin in Irish)  is a townland in the historical Barony of Ormond Lower, County Tipperary, Ireland. It is located in the civil parish of Lorrha in the north of the county and includes an area of callows alongside the River Shannon.

Redwood Castle
Redwood Castle, a restored Norman castle with a Sheela na gig. is located overlooking the callows.

References

Townlands of County Tipperary